Izieu is a commune in the Ain department in eastern France.

It lies on the river Rhône, between the cities of Lyon and Chambéry.

Site of World War II Jewish orphanage
Izieu was the site of a Jewish orphanage during the Second World War. However, most of the children were only separated from their parents or sent purposely in the Savoy mountains which was then under Italian rule. Italy was less oppressive in that time. On 6 April 1944, three vehicles pulled up in front of the orphanage. The Gestapo, under the direction of the 'Butcher of Lyon' Klaus Barbie, entered the orphanage and forcibly removed the forty-four children and their seven supervisors, throwing the crying and terrified children on to the trucks.

As a witness later recalled: 'I was on my way down the stairs when my sister shouted to me: It's the Germans, run away! I jumped out the window. I hid myself in a bush in the garden. I heard the cries of the children that were being kidnapped and I heard the shouts of the Nazis who were carrying them away.'

Following the raid on their home in Izieu, the children were shipped directly to the "collection center" in Drancy, then put on the first available train towards the concentration camps in the East.

Forty-two children and five adults were gassed in the concentration camp of Auschwitz. Two of the oldest children and Miron Zlatin, the superintendent, ended up in Tallinn, Estonia, and were killed by a firing squad.

The orphanage director Sabine Zlatin survived the Gestapo raid, being away collecting funds for the institution. Some 40 years later she testified against Barbie at his trial. Towards the end of her life, she convinced the president François Mitterrand to turn the orphanage premises into a memorial.

Population

See also
Communes of the Ain department

References

External links

 Official Website of Holocaust Memorial Maison d'Izieu
 
 the Jewish orphanage in Izieu during the Holocaust - an online exhibition at Yad Vashem website

Communes of Ain
Jewish French history
The Holocaust in France
Ain communes articles needing translation from French Wikipedia